Yaron Brook (born May 23, 1961) is an Israeli-American entrepreneur, writer, and activist. He is an Objectivist and the current chairman of the board at the Ayn Rand Institute, where he was executive director from 2000 to 2017. He is also the co-founder of BHZ Capital Management LP.

Biography 
Yaron Brook was born and raised in Israel. His parents were Jewish socialists from South Africa. When he was sixteen, a friend lent him a copy of Ayn Rand's Atlas Shrugged, leading him to abandon the socialism taught to him by his parents and to embrace Objectivism. After graduating from high school, he served as a first sergeant in Israeli military intelligence (1979–1982) and then earned a Bachelor of Science in civil engineering in 1986 from the Technion – Israel Institute of Technology in Haifa. In 1987, he moved to the United States, where he received his Master of Business Administration in 1989 and PhD in finance in 1994 from the University of Texas at Austin. Yaron Brook is married and has 2 grown children.

Academic and business career 
Brook began his career as a finance professor at the Leavey School of Business at Santa Clara University, a position he held for seven years and which won him awards of recognition.

In 1998, he co-founded BH Equity Research with Robert Hendershott. BH Equity Management was a financial advisory firm. In 2019, BH Equity dissolved and BHZ Capital Management LP became the new entity.

Brook became an associate of leading Objectivist intellectuals, such as philosopher Leonard Peikoff, and in 1994, he co-founded Lyceum International, a company that organized Objectivist conferences and offered distance-learning courses. In 2000, he left Santa Clara University to succeed Michael Berliner as President and Executive Director of the Ayn Rand Institute, which was then located in Marina del Rey, California. In 2002, ARI relocated to Irvine, California.

Brook speaks and debates at numerous American universities, delivering seminars for businesses and corporations in the United States and abroad, and writing opinion editorials for leading newspapers and websites. Speaking venues include conferences, professional organizations, and community groups. His subjects span a wide range of current events and philosophical issues, including the causes of the financial crisis, the morality of capitalism, and ending the growth of the state, each discussed with Objectivism at its foundation. In recent years, he has spoken to audiences throughout the world, including those in China, Australia, Brazil, Argentina, Greece, Iceland, Bulgaria, Israel, Guatemala, and England.

Brook was a columnist for Forbes, and his articles have been featured in The Wall Street Journal, USA Today, Investor's Business Daily, and many other publications. A frequent guest on a variety of radio and national television programs, he is the co-author of Neoconservatism: An Obituary for an Idea and Free Market Revolution: How Ayn Rand's Ideas Can End Big Government, and contributing author of Winning the Unwinnable War: America's Self-Crippled Response to Islamic Totalitarianism. His newest book is In Pursuit of Wealth: The Moral Case for Finance, co-authored with Don Watkins.

The Yaron Brook Show 
On January 7, 2015, the day of the Charlie Hebdo shooting, Brook made his first-ever podcast and premiered The Yaron Brook Show.

The program does not have a set schedule. However, the program is livestreamed on many social-media platforms, approximately, four times/week. When Brook is home, scheduled programs are more predictably livestreamed. When Brook is on the road, scheduled programs are more intermittent.

Events 
Brook speaks at events hosted by private companies, student organizations and non-profits in America and internationally.

Brook is a contributor, and frequent speaker at events, with The Federalist Society.

On September 27, 2017, at the Yale Student Chapter of The Federalist Society, Brook participated in an event named, "Income Inequality: Is It Fair or Unfair?". This debate is the most watched video, ever, on The Federalist Society's YouTube channel.

Podcasts 
Through the years, Brook has produced many shows, on many types of issues. Some of these shows have been made into series.

In something of an answer(s) to Jordan Peterson's Rules for Life, in April 2021, Brook made a show on his rules for living. The show was a hit and became the launchpad for a series.

The shows are given unique titles, describing the program's topic. Don't Stop Moving, Being Optimistic in a Crazy World, and, most recently, Cultivating the Virtue of Justice, are just some examples of what the series tackles.

As of June 2022, sixteen podcasts have been produced for this series.

Ingenuism 
On January 19, 2021, Brook, along with Robert Hendershott and Don Watkins, launched Ingenuism on Substack. To introduce themselves, the title of their first post was, "Progress at the speed of thought".

Views and opinions

Rational selfishness 
Brook promotes the Objectivist ethical position that rational selfishness is a moral virtue and that altruism is evil. Yaron Lectures: The Morality of Selfishness a talk for Cheongshim International Academy and Yaron Debates: Selfishness is a Virtue, Brook vs Epstein; Moderated by Judge Napolitano are two recent presentations of this ethical position.

Politics and economics 
Brook is an outspoken proponent of laissez-faire capitalism. In appearances on CNBC and several articles and speeches, he has defended the rights of corporations and businessmen and upheld the virtues of capitalism. In a January 7, 2007, editorial in USA Today, he defended multimillion-dollar CEO pay packages against the attempt by the government to regulate them. In a 2010 interview, Brook called the efforts of Democrats to raise taxes on multi-millionaires "totally immoral." He criticized George W. Bush for signing the Sarbanes-Oxley Act, which regulates corporate accounting practices. He has also argued that antitrust laws are "unjust and make no sense ethically or economically."

On gun rights, Brook has stated, "The government certainly has a role in regulating ownership of weapons", but he states that it is a "complex" issue to do with the philosophy of law. He is inclined to draw the line of prohibition between "offensive" weapons, such as tanks and weapons of mass destruction, and "defensive" weapons.

In interviews and through his writings and podcasts, he criticized the Republican Party and the George W. Bush and Donald Trump administrations for not abiding by free market principles and for enabling excessive government involvement in the economy.

Brook has taught financial courses dealing with topics such as the Financial Crisis, the corporation, and many more.

Foreign policy 

Brook applies Objectivist moral philosophy to the question of American foreign policy, particularly on the Middle East. He advocates an American foreign policy of rational self-interest that would serve only to protect the rights of Americans, as opposed to any form of government monetary aid, state-building, or spreading democracy. He has criticized the foreign policy of Ron Paul and other libertarians.

He advocates the withdrawal of US troops from Europe, and US withdrawal from the North Atlantic Treaty Organization and the United Nations, calling the latter "one of the most immoral institutions ever created by man". He is ambivalent about the World Trade Organization.

Brook called for an embargo on North Korea.

Brook has taught foreign policy courses dealing with topics such as the history of the Middle East.

Islamic terrorism 
Brook argues that Islamic terrorists initiated a war against the West because they hate its culture, wealth, love of life, and global influence, and that they attack Israel because of the influence Western culture has had on it. He  rejects the idea that Islamic terrorists attack Western nations because they support Israel or because of poverty or retaliation.Brook claims that the West is not at war with terrorism but the ideology of Islamic totalitarianism. He repeatedly says that just like in World War II, the US was at war against not Japanese kamikaze pilots or German tanks but the ideas of Nazism and Japanese imperialism.Brook claims that Islamic totalitarians are Muslims who wish to dictate every part of life from the teachings of Islam, taken to its logical extreme. He believes that Islamic totalitarians want to organize their governments according to Islam and that they wish to spread a global Islamic government across the world, sometimes by using legitimate means but mainly by using physical force, terrorism. Brook claims that the Islamic totalitarians repeatedly express that openly by arguing:

Brook has taught courses on Islamic terrorism covering topics like the rise of totalitarian Islam.

Morality of war 
Brook has laid out a unique theory of the morality of war, based on the ideas of Ayn Rand  and Leonard Peikoff.

Israel 
Brook considers Israel to be a morally good nation because its Western-style government protects the rights of its citizens, Arab and Jewish alike, vastly more than neighboring countries. On Zionism, Brook argued that "Zionism fused a valid concern—self-preservation amid a storm of hostility—with a toxic premise: ethnically based collectivism and religion."

Brook advocates supporting Israel, which he sees as a Western ally against Islamic terrorism.Brook  disagrees with many of Israel's policies, including its collectivist and religious influences, and its “self-sacrificial” foreign policy of giving its enemies land, money, and other goods.

Published works

Books

Other 
 Corporate governance: a study of director liability, firm performance and shareholder wealth, University of Texas, Austin, 1994 [thesis]
 Shareholder wealth effects of directors' liability limitation provisions, Brook, Yaron; Rao, Ramesh K. S., Journal of Financial & Quantitative Analysis, vol. 3, 1994, 481–497
 Terrorism in Israel, Yaron Brook, The Intellectual Activist, Vol. 10, No. 4, July 1996
 The gains from takeover deregulation: Evidence from the end of interstate banking restrictions , Brook, Yaron; Hendershott, Robert; Darrell Lee, Journal of Finance the journal of the American Finance Association, {Malden, Mass. et al.: Blackwell}, vol. 6, 1998, 2185–2204
 Do Firms Use Dividends to Signal Large Future Cash Flow Increases?, Brook, Yaron; Charlton, William T., Jr.; Hendershott, Robert J., Financial Management, (Tampa, Fla. : Financial Management Association International) vol. 3, 1998, 46–57
 Corporate Governance and Recent Consolidation in the Banking Industry , Brook, Yaron; Hendershott, Robert J.; Lee, Darrell, Journal of Corporate Finance: contracting, governance and organization, (Santa Clara U; Kennesaw State U), vol. 2, 2000, pp. 141–164
 Hype and Internet Stocks, Brook, Yaron; Hendershott, Robert J., The Journal of Investing, vol. 2, 53–64
 "Just War Theory" vs. American Self-Defense, Yaron Brook, Alex Epstein, The Objective Standard, Vol. 1, No. 1, Spring 2006
 "The 'Forward Strategy' For Failure, Yaron Brook, Elan Journo, The Objective Standard, Vol. 2, No. 1, Spring 2007
 Brook's article on CEO compensation in USA Today

References

External links 

 
  
 Yaron Brook on YouTube channel
 
 Yaron Brook's profile page from the Ayn Rand Institute
 Yaron Brook on C-SPAN
 Ingenuism on Substack
 Ingenuism on YouTube
 Ingenuism on Apple Podcasts
 Ingenuism | Podcast on Spotify

1961 births
Living people
20th-century American male writers
20th-century American non-fiction writers
21st-century American businesspeople
21st-century American male writers
21st-century American non-fiction writers
American libertarians
American male non-fiction writers
American people of Polish-Jewish descent
American people of South African-Jewish descent
American political writers
Ayn Rand Institute
Israeli academics
Israeli emigrants to the United States
Israeli Jews
Israeli people of South African-Jewish descent
Israeli political writers
Jewish American writers
Jewish anti-communists
McCombs School of Business alumni
Objectivism scholars
Objectivists
Santa Clara University School of Business faculty
Technion – Israel Institute of Technology alumni